The 26th Arabian Gulf Cup will be the 26th edition of the biennial football competition for the eight members of the Arab Gulf Cup Football Federation. The tournament will be held in Kuwait in December 2024.

Teams

Group stage

Group A

Group B

Knockout stage
In the knockout stage, extra time and penalty shoot-out are used to decide the winner if necessary.

Bracket

Semi-finals

Final

References

Arabian Gulf Cup
2024 in Asian football
International association football competitions hosted by Kuwait
December 2024 sports events in Asia